Silvia Angélica Navarro Barba (born September 14, 1978) is a Mexican actress. She debuted as actress in 1997, in the lead role in the telenovela Perla. Since then, she continued to work for Mexican TV network TV Azteca, and later for Televisa and Telemundo.

Biography
Navarro was born on September 14, 1978 in Irapuato, Guanajuato. She attended and graduated from "Centro de Estudios y Formación" (CEFAC), TV Azteca's acting school in Mexico City. She studied with accomplished instructors such as Raul Quintanilla and Héctor Mendoza.

In 2012, Navarro confirmed she's in a relationship with Gerardo Casanova. On February 17, 2015 Silvia confirmed her pregnancy and later revealed that the baby was a boy. On September 7, 2015 she announced that she gave birth to her first son, León. In an Instagram live in 2020, she revealed she is no longer in a romantic relationship with her son’s father.

Career
Navarro's career began when she was still a baby, appearing in ads for different brands. As a child, she did casting for children's telenovela Carrusel and got a role, but had to quit to go live with her father in another city. At age 18, Navarro was the host of a game show called A la cachi, cachi porra, broadcast by Canal Once.

In 1998, she did casting for Azteca's telenovela Perla, and unexpectedly, won the leading role. After that she continued to appear in Azteca's telenovelas in a leading roles such as: Catalina y Sebastián, La calle de las novias, Cuando seas mía, La duda and La heredera.

In 2007, after three years of absence from telenovelas, Navarro returns to Azteca to star in Montecristo. The same year, she joined the cast of the play Chicas católicas, which tell the story of several girls between age 6 and 12, who begin to discover the life, and star in the film Amor letra por letra alongside Plutarco Haza.

In 2008, after 10 years, Navarro left Azteca and joined Televisa. On August 23, 2008, Navarro joined the cast of the production of Nicandro Díaz González, Mañana es para siempre alongside Fernando Colunga and Lucero. It became the most successful telenovela in the United States, where it's followed by more than 6 million viewers.

In 2009 she participated in the play Todos eran mis hijos, and in the movies, Cabeza de Buda, Asesino serial.

In 2010, Navarro appeared in Cuando me enamoro, produced by Carlos Moreno, achieving again a great success in rating. In addition, she opened her first restaurant, 'Sabor Amor'. On 2014, three years later, she closed it after low revenue.

In 2011, Navarro starred in the Comedy film Labios rojos, alongside Jorge Salinas, where she plays a woman who seeks by all means the solution to the sexual problems she has with her husband.

She returned to the small screen in 2012, starring in Amor bravío, produced by Carlos Moreno, and gave life to 'Camila', a strong woman who after a great tragedy seeks her life and destiny in the Hacienda 'La Malquerida'. Two years later, Navarro starred in the comedy Mi corazón es tuyo, a production of Juan Osorio, alongside Jorge Salinas and Mayrín Villanueva.

On July 12, 2016, Navarro starred in the telenovela of Giselle González's, La candidata. She will continue to collaborate with the producer on her next telenovela Caer en tentación.

On October 15, 2020 Navarro confirmed she would be protagonising the titular character, Loli Aguilar on La suerte de Loli. This was her first time working for TV network Telemundo and in a production in the United States. The series premieres in January 2021.

Filmography

Awards and nominations

Premios Diosas de Plata

Premios People en Español 

 2012: The magazine People en Español named her as one of "50 Most Beautiful".

Premios Juventud

Association of Theatre Journalists Awards

Association of Theatre Critics and Journalists Awards

TV Adicto Golden Awards

Premios TVyNovelas

References

External links

Official Website of Silvia Navarro

1978 births
Living people
Mexican telenovela actresses
Mexican television actresses
Mexican film actresses
Mexican stage actresses
Actresses from Guanajuato
20th-century Mexican actresses
21st-century Mexican actresses
People educated at Centro de Estudios y Formación Actoral
People from Irapuato